is one of the eight wards of Niigata City, Niigata Prefecture, in the Hokuriku region of  Japan. It comprises much of the city centre. , the ward had an estimated population of 183,231 in 87,162 households  and a population density of 4,900 persons per km2.

Geography
Chūō-ku is located in the approximate centre of Niigata City, bounded by the Sea of Japan to the north and the Nihonkai-Tōhoku Expressway to the south.

Neighboring municipalities/wards
Niigata Prefecture
Higashi-ku, Niigata
Kōnan-ku, Niigata
Nishi-ku, Niigata

Neighborhoods

Central Business District
Chūō-ku is the heart of Niigata in terms of economic and political importance. The City Office is located here along with several central government and prefectural agencies.
Japan's national broadcaster NHK has its prefectural TV station and radio station in Chūō-ku.
There are several company head offices based in the district. It is also the site of old Niigata City which extends from Niigata Station downtown to Bandai Bridge and Furumachi.

Furumachi

Furumachi in Niigata city is located on left bank of Shinano River across Bandai Bridge. It lies on Niigata Island and faces the Sea of Japan. The area has been developed around Masaya-koji, which is a wide six-lane thoroughfare connecting Furumachi with Niigata Station. Furumachi has business districts as well as several historic parts. Narrow alleyways and streets crisscross beneath the modern office buildings. The historic Honcho market is also here. Much of the area contains modern buildings. This is because Furumachi was rebuilt after an earthquake devastated this part of eastern Niigata in 1964. This is in marked contrast with areas on the west side of the river which still retain traditional-looking streets containing older houses.

History

The area of present-day Chūō-ku was part of ancient Echigo Province, and developed as a port town for Nagaoka Domain under the Edo period Tokugawa Shogunate. Niigata was one of the ports opened to foreign trade by the 1858 Harris Treaty. Modern Niigata city was created with the establishment of the municipalities system on April 1, 1889. The Hokuetsu Railway commented Niigata to Tokyo in 1897, and the first Bandai Bridge across the Shinano River was completed in 1908, shortly before the city was destroyed by a fire. The city escaped serious damage in World War II; however, much of the city burned down in a fire in 1955 and again suffered from damage in the 1964 Niigata earthquake.

Niigata became a government-designated city on April 1, 2007, and was divided into wards, with the new Chūō Ward consisting of much of the central business portion of the city.

Education

Universities
 Niigata University (Asahimachi Campus / Nishi-Ohata Campus)
 Niigata Seiryo University
 The Nippon Dental University (Niigata)

Secondary education
Chūō-ku has five public high schools operated by the Niigata Prefectural Board of Education, two public high schools operated by the Niigata City Board of Education, three private high schools and one private combined middle school/high school. The ward also has ten public middle schools operated by the city government.

Transportation

Railway
 JR East -  Jōetsu Shinkansen
 
 JR East -  Shin'etsu Main Line
 
 JR East -  Hakushin Line

 JR East - Echigo Line
  -  -

Transit bus
 Niigata City Loop Bus
 Transit bus operated by Niigata Kotsu
 BRT "Bandai-bashi Line" : Niigata Sta.—Bandai Bridge—Furumachi—City office—Hakusan Sta.—(Aoyama)
 C* : for Central Niigata
 S* : for South Niigata 
 W* : for West Niigata
 E* : for East Niigata
 "Sado-Kisen Line" : Niigata Sta.—Toki Messe—Sado Kisen Ferry Terminal

Highways
 
 
 
 
 ]

Ports
 Sado Kisen Ferry Terminal

Water Shuttle
 Shinanogawa Water Shuttle:  MINATOPIA - Toki Messe - Bandai Bridge - Bandai City - Niigata Prefectural office - (FURUSATO VILLAGE)

Local attractions

West side of the Shinano River
 Niigata City History Museum (Minatopia)
 The Niigata Saitou Villa
 Hakusan Park
 Niigata-City Performing Arts Center (Ryutopia)
 Niigata Prefectural Civic Center
 Niigata city Aquarium (Marinepia Nihonkai)
 Next21 skyscraper
 Furumachi-dori Shopping Mall
 Honcho-dori Shopping Mall
 Ninjo-Yokocho Shopping Mall

East side of the Shinano River
 Niigata Station
 Sake Museum Ponshu-kan
 Bandai City shopping district
 LoveLa Shopping Mall
 LoveLa2 Shopping Mall
 Niigata Manga & Animation Museum
 NGT48 Idol unit
 Niigata Nippo Media Ship
 Toki Messe

South side of the Toyanogata Lagoon
 Big Swan Stadium
 Niigata Prefectural Baseball Stadium

Events
 Niigata Festival (every August)
Niigata Comic Market
Niigata Manga Competition

See also
Niigata city

References

External links

 Niigata official website 
 Niigata Chūō-ku website 
 Niigata City Official Tourist Information (multilingual)
 Niigata Pref. Official Travel Guide (multilingual)

Wards of Niigata (city)